Carlos Fuentes International Prize for Literary Creation in the Spanish Language (Spanish: Premio Internacional Carlos Fuentes a la Creación Literaria en el Idioma Español) is a literary award established in 2012 by the Mexican government in honor of Mexican writer Carlos Fuentes. It is awarded every year on November 11, the birthday of Fuentes. The prize has a remuneration of  making it one of the richest literary prizes in the world.

The jury is composed of seven people including a member of Spain’s Royal Academy of the Spanish Language, another from the Mexican Spanish-language academy, one more from another academy in Latin America or the Philippines, and four additional academic or literary figures from Mexico.

Recipients

References

External links
Carlos Fuentes Prize, official website

2012 establishments in Mexico
Awards established in 2012
Literary awards honoring writers
Mexican literary awards
Spanish-language literary awards